The 2023 Long Beach State Beach men's volleyball team represents Long Beach State University in the 2023 NCAA Division I & II men's volleyball season. The Beach, led by twentieth year head coach Alan Knipe, play their home games at Walter Pyramid. The Beach compete as members of the Big West Conference and were picked as second in the Big West preseason poll.

Preseason

Coaches poll 
The preseason poll was released on December 21, 2022. Long Beach State was picked to finish second in the Big West Conference standings.

Roster

Schedule
TV/Internet Streaming/Radio information:
22 West Media will carry select Long Beach State men's volleyball matches on the radio.
ESPN+ will carry most home and all conference road games. All other road broadcasts will be carried by the schools respective streaming partner. 

 *-Indicates conference match.
 Times listed are Pacific Time Zone.

Announcers for televised games
Lindenwood: Matt Brown & Tyler Kulakowski
George Mason: 
Penn State: 
Loyola Chicago:  
UCLA: 
UCLA: 
NJIT:  
NJIT: 
Ball State: 
UC Santa Barbara: 
UC Santa Barbara: 
Hawai'i: 
Hawai'i: 
USC: 
USC: 
UC San Diego: 
UC San Diego: 
CSUN: 
CSUN: 
UC Irvine: 
UC Irvine:

Rankings 

^The Media did not release a Pre-season or Week 1 poll.

References

2023 in sports in California
2023 NCAA Division I & II men's volleyball season
2023 team
Long Beach State